Jim Lewis may refer to:

Arts 
 Jim Lewis (novelist) (born 1963), American novelist
 Jim Lewis (writer) (born 1955), Muppet writer

Sports 
 Jim Lewis (1980s pitcher) (born 1955), Minnesota Twins, Seattle Mariners, and New York Yankees pitcher
 Jim Lewis (1990s pitcher) (born 1964), San Diego Padres baseball pitcher
 Jim Lewis (basketball), WNBA head coach
 Jim Lewis (footballer, born 1909) (1909–1980), Welsh footballer who played for Watford during the 1930s and early 1940s
 Jim Lewis (footballer, born 1927) (1927–2011), English footballer who played for Chelsea during the 1950s
 Jim Lewis (Irish footballer) (1874–1957), international goalkeeper
 Jim Lewis (racehorse owner) (1934–2023), owner of Best Mate
 Jim Lewis (Negro leagues), Negro leagues baseball player

Others 
 James Paul Lewis, Jr., perpetrator of one of the longest running Ponzi schemes in history
 Jim Lewis (astrologer) (1941–1995), American astrologer
 Jim Lewis (business executive) (born 1953), former president of Disney Vacation Club, now an executive with Wal*Mart Stores

See also  
 James Lewis (disambiguation)
 Lewis (surname)